Vladimir Yerofeyev may refer to:

 Vladimir Ivanovich Yerofeyev (1920–2011), Soviet diplomat
 Vladimir Yerofeyev (football coach) (born 1944), Russian football coach
  (1909–1986), Soviet ambassador